Upland Brewing Company is a brewery in Bloomington, Indiana, United States. Founded in 1997, it is the third largest brewery in the state, with six locations across central Indiana, and makes over 80 beers a year, including ales, lagers, and sour beers.

History
Upland Brewing Company was founded in 1997 by Marc Sattinger, Russ Levitt and Dean LaPlante.  The brewery takes its name from the Indiana Uplands, a geographic region of southern Indiana, with Bloomington being near their northern terminus. In 1998, distribution of bottles and kegs began and the brewpub opened its doors. The first beers on tap were the Wheat Ale, Pale Ale, and Bad Elmer's Porter. The brewpub began serving food the following year. Growing to be a Central Indiana staple, by 2004 its distribution had reached all 92 counties of Indiana. In 2006, ownership changed hands to a group  of local investors remains 100% family owned. By 2010, distribution had expanded to include ales and lagers throughout Indiana and in parts of Kentucky, Ohio, Illinois, and Wisconsin with small batch sour ales selling only through its tap room.  In 2016, Upland began limited distribution nationally after adding a wood-aged sour beer production facility and is currently distributing in 20+ markets across the country.

In 2009 a 2nd location known as the Indy Tasting Room opened in Indianapolis in the Meridian-Kessler/south Broad Ripple neighborhood. In 2012, a new brewing facility and bar was opened on the west side of Bloomington. This 37,000 square foot facility became the primary brewing facility for Upland, encompassing their everyday and seasonal lineup. The old brewery on 11th Street was scaled down to become a research and development site for Upland's growing Belgian-style sour and wild ale program.  Also in 2012, Upland obtained the rights to Champagne Velvet, a pre-prohibition pilsener originally made by Terre Haute Brewing Co in 1902, and began brewing and distributing the classic brew under the Upland name. In 2013, Upland expanded further north with the addition of the Carmel Tap House, their second site to serve food. In the summer of 2016, Upland opened a new restaurant location in Columbus. It is fixed in the old Columbus Pump House building downtown, giving it the name "The Pump House". Later that same year, Upland opened The Wood Shop to serve as the home for their sour ale production, located next door to the Bloomington Brewpub. The Indy Tasting Room was renovated in 2018 and in 2019 saw a restaurant added on. The expanded space became known as 'Upland College Ave' due to its location at 49th & College Avenue. Upland's seventh location and fifth restaurant is set to open in mid-2019 in the Fountain Square neighborhood and will be known as 'Upland FSQ'.

Sours
Upland Brewing has been a sour producer for over 10 years. After trading a few cases of beer for a few wine barrels from Oliver Winery in 2006, they began their exploration into sour brewing. The Wood Shop, a brewery and taproom dedicated to sour ales, was opened in 2016.

Sour Wild Funk Fest is Upland's annual festival which takes place in Indianapolis every spring. Featuring approximately 50 breweries from across the world. Since 2017 the festival has been held at the Mavris Arts & Event Center.

Beers
Upland Brewing Company has a year-round lineup of beers as well as several limited and seasonal releases.

Everyday beers include:
Upland Wheat Ale
Dragonfly India Pale Ale
Champagne Velvet Pre-Prohibition Pilsener
Bad Elmer's Porter 
Campside Pale Ale
Juiced in Time Hazy IPA

Hard Seltzer:
Naked Barrel Cherry Lime
Naked Barrel Grapefruit Hibiscus
Naked Barrel Tangerine

Seasonal brews include:
Petal To The Kettle Sour Ale
Two of Tarts Gose
Modern Tart Kettle Sour Ale
Tropical Vortex Southern Hemisphere IPA
Patio Cat Hazy Guava Summer Ale
Oktoberfest
Teddy Bear Kisses Variants
Teddy Bear Kisses Russian Imperial Stout

Limited releases include:
Syrupticious
Breaking Away
Juiced My Style Imperial IPA
Coastbuster Imperial IPA
Sound Bite Juicy Pale Ale
Barrel Chested Barleywine

See also
Beer in the United States
List of breweries in Indiana

References

Companies based in Indiana
Beer brewing companies based in Indiana
1997 establishments in Indiana
American companies established in 1997
Bloomington, Indiana